The FIS Ski Flying World Ski Championships 2008 took place on 21–24 February 2008 in Oberstdorf, Germany for the record tying fifth time, matching that of Planica, Slovenia. Oberstdorf  hosted the championships previously in 1973, 1981, 1988, and 1998. For the first time, both events were held in the evening. Finland's Janne Ahonen won his record seventh medal though none of them have been gold with five silvers and two bronzes.

Individual
22–23 February 2008.

Koch had the longest jump of the competition with a 221.0 m second round jump. Norway's Bjørn Einar Romøren led after the first two rounds, but had a poor third round jump to fall to third, allowing Koch to take the lead. Schlierenzauer, who had the second-best jump in each of the previous three rounds, had the longest jump in the final round to win the championships for the first time. Two-time defending champion Roar Ljøkelsøy of Norway finished 32nd after being eliminated in the first round.

Team
24 February 2008.

Schlierenzauer had the longest jump of the competition with his 217.0 m second round jump. Finland earned their third straight silver medal in this event.

Medal table

References

FIS Ski Flying World Championships
2008 in ski jumping
2008 in German sport
Ski jumping competitions in Germany
International sports competitions hosted by Germany
2008 in Bavaria
Sports competitions in Bavaria
February 2008 sports events in Europe